David Bangurah (born 15 January 1996 in Freetown, Sierra Leone) is a Sierra Leonean footballer who plays for Karmiotissa Polemidion as an attacking midfielder and winger. He also holds British citizenship.

Youth career
Bangurah joined Reading academy in 2008. He represented the Reading academy at various tournaments both local and international such as the Milk Cup, Nike Cup, and Tertnes Entreprenør Cup 2010 in Norway where he was awarded man of the match in the final.

References

Sierra Leonean footballers
Karmiotissa FC players
Sportspeople from Freetown
Sierra Leonean expatriate footballers
1996 births
Living people

Association football midfielders